On February 21, 2023, the United States Securities and Exchange Commission (SEC) charged the Church of Jesus Christ of Latter-day Saints (LDS Church) and its non-profit investment arm, Ensign Peak Advisors for failing to disclose the LDS Church's investments, and instead creating shell companies whose purpose was to obscure the LDS Church's portfolio. The SEC further charged that the forms that were filed by the shell companies deliberately concealed the amount of control that Ensign Peak Advisors had over investment decisions.

The charges were settled, with the LDS Church paying a $1 million penalty, and Ensign Peak Advisors paying a $4 million penalty.

Background
In 1963, the LDS Church was on the brink of insolvency, and N. Eldon Tanner was brought in to rescue the LDS Church finances. Tanner emphasized investing and a disdain for deficit spending, returning the LDS Church finances to sound footing. In 1997, the LDS Church split off its investment division and created a separate legal entity called Ensign Peak Advisors.

Form 13F is a quarterly report filed, per SEC regulations, by "institutional investment managers" with control over $100M in assets to the SEC, listing all equity assets under management. The purpose of the form is to provide transparency over who owns stocks.

Timeline
 1997: Ensign Peak Advisors created as a non-profit to manage LDS Church investments
 1998: Senior leadership of the LDS Church, defined as the First Presidency and Presiding Bishopric, approved a plan to file Form 13F through a separate entity in order to prevent disclosure of the securities portfolio.
 2001: The first of thirteen shell companies was created, a trust fund with a separate LLC under the trust's ownership. The LLC had an address in Glendale, Arizona but did not conduct business out of that site. Employees of Ensign Peak Advisors were assigned as managers of the trust, but not granted investment discretion.
 2003: Form 13F is first filed for the newly created shell company.
 2005: Senior leaders of the LDS Church approve a second shell company is created, based out of Wilmington, Delaware. The LDS Church created the new entity after discovering that the person signing the forms was listed in a public directory as an LDS Church employee and that the shell company could be traced back to the LDS Church.
 2011: Five additional shell companies were approved by senior leaders after LDS Church leaders became concerned that the growing size of the investment portfolio would bring "unwanted attention." Addresses of the five shell companies were in Delaware, but no business was conducted in that state.
 2014: An internal LDS Church audit "highlighted the risk that the SEC might disagree with the approach" but did not recommend changes.
 2015: An unnamed third party connected some of the shell companies with Ensign Peak Advisors, and brought the issue to senior leaders of the LDS Church. The senior leaders approved a plan to "gradually and carefully adapt Ensign Peak’s corporate structure to strengthen the portfolio’s confidentiality." This included the creation of six more shell companies, whose managers had "common names and a limited presence on social media, and were therefore less likely to be publicly connected to Ensign Peak or the Church." Selected managers were given limited information on the purpose of the shell companies.
 2017: A second LDS Church audit again highlighted the risk of the investment approach.
 2018: The Mormon Leaks website discovers that the 13 shell companies all have web domains hosted by LDS Church servers. Business managers are also connected by Mormon Leaks as LDS Church employees. Two of the business managers resign, out of concern with what had been asked of them. They are replaced with different managers.
 2019: The SEC first contacts the LDS Church over its reporting structure.
 2020: Ensign Peak Advisors files a consolidated disclosure for the first time. 
 2023: On February 21, the SEC announces publicly the charges against the LDS Church and Ensign Peak Advisors, along with the settlement. The LDS Church agrees to pay $4 million and Ensign Peak Advisors agrees to a $1 million penalty.

Structure of shell companies
Shell companies were formed as limited liability companies (LLC). LLCs were designed to make it difficult to connect with the LDS Church and Ensign Peak Advisors. LLCs were dispersed geographic locations throughout the United States outside the state of Utah. Ensign Peak Advisors granted management authority to a hand picked manager, but retained investment authority and discresion over each LLC.

The SEC asserts that managers of the LLCs were not given sufficient information to accurately check the box that the form filled out was "true, correct and complete." Several times electronic signatures were forwarded to the SEC by Ensign Peak Advisors before managers provided handwritten signatures. Additionally, managers incorrectly misstated that they were signing forms at the location of the LLC's stated address, given that each manager was located in Salt Lake City, Utah.

Response
Henry T. C. Hu, a corporate and securities law professor at the University of Texas law school, stated, "What the law requires is so clear that I am genuinely surprised that anyone would do this"  Jacob S. Frenkel, a former senior counsel in the SEC's division of enforcement, commented in regards to the small size of the fine: "They are showing institutional respect for the church. If this had been a private institution, the monetary penalty would have much larger."

Sam Brunson, a member of the LDS Church and tax law professor at Loyola University Chicago, remarked on the "incredibly aggressive" way of obscuring finances "for the last 70 years or so, the Mormon Church has had an ethos of keeping its finances private."

LDS Church response
In a statement, the church said that:

References

The Church of Jesus Christ of Latter-day Saints
Mormonism-related controversies
U.S. Securities and Exchange Commission litigation